Wheelchair rugby at the 1996 Summer Paralympics consisted of a mixed team event. Wheelchair rugby was being contested as a demonstration sport, and not an official part of the Paralympic program, but medals were awarded and stayed on medal table. Six teams took part in the sport; Sweden and Australia were eliminated after the preliminary round.

Medal summary

Classification
Wheelchair rugby players were given a classification based on their upper body function. A committee gave each athlete a 7-level score ranging from 0.5 to 3.5, with lower scores corresponding to more severe disability. During the game, the total score of all players on the court for a team cannot exceed 8 points. However, for each female player on court, their team gets an extra 0.5 points over the 8 point limit.

Teams

Six teams took part in this sport. Each team could have up to 12 athletes, but no more than 11 of the team members could be male. Listed below are the six teams qualified for the Atlanta Paralympics.

Tournament

Competition format 
The six teams participated in a single round robin tournament. The top four teams went on to compete for 1st through 4th place, while the last two teams are eliminated.

Preliminary round 

 Qualified for quarterfinals
 Eliminated
Source: Paralympic.org

Medal round

Source: Paralympic.org

Ranking

Gallery

External links
 International Wheelchair Rugby Federation

References 

1996 Summer Paralympics events
1996